Paramantis is a genus of praying mantises that includes these species:

 Paramantis natalensis
 Paramantis nyassana
 Paramantis prasina - type species
 Paramantis sacra
 Paramantis togana
 Paramantis victoriana
 Paramantis viridis

See also
List of mantis genera and species

References

Mantidae
Mantodea genera